The Kalapi Award (Gujarati:કલાપી ઍવોર્ડ) is an annual award given to Gujarati ghazal poets. It was founded by the INT Aditya Birla Centre for Performing Arts and Research. The award is named after Gujarati poet Kalapi. The amount of  25000 is awarded to recognize and promote Gujarati ghazal poets.

Recipients 
The Kalapi Award has been granted annually since 1997 to the following people:

See also 
 Kalapi
 Shayda Award

References

Awards established in 1997
1997 establishments in Gujarat
Gujarati literary awards